Annakili Sonna Kathai is a 1989 Indian Tamil-language film directed by S. Devarajan for Sri Ananda Lakshmi Fim Combines. The film stars Sathyaraj and Shaloo . The film was a remake of Kannada film Manamecchida Hudugi.

Cast 

Sathyaraj
Sudha Rani
Anand Kumar
Malaysia Vasudevan

Soundtrack
Soundtrack was composed by Chandrabose.
"Bannari" - Malaysia Vasudevan
"Aathukulle" - Deepan Chakravarthy, Vanitha
"Naaval Pazhame" - Mano, S. P. Sailaja
"Kanmaniye" - SPB, K. S. Chithra

References

1989 films
1980s Tamil-language films
1989 romantic drama films
Indian romantic drama films
Tamil remakes of Kannada films
Films scored by Chandrabose (composer)